Red Rock is a Quaternary complex volcano in the Australian state of Victoria. The volcano is structurally complicated, consisting of a series of volcanic cones and maars. Some of the maars are intermittently filled by brackish to saline crater lakes. These include Lake Werowarp, Lake Coragulac, Lake Gnalinegurk and Lake Purdiguluc.

Red Rock, along with Tower Hill, Purrumbete and Leura, is one of the best preserved phreatomagmatic features in Eastern Australia. At least 30 eruptive vents have been identified at the volcano, with the latest known eruption having taken place possibly in 5850 BCE. This makes Red Rock one of the Newer Volcanics Province centres to have been active during the Holocene epoch.

The Red Rock Reserve was established in 1903 to preserve the volcanic landscape. This protected area was upgraded to a public recreation reserve in 1934.

References

Volcanoes of Victoria (Australia)
Maars of Australia
Complex volcanoes
Volcanic cones
Volcanic crater lakes
Protected areas of Victoria (Australia)
Mountains of Barwon South West (region)